Yael Arad (born May 1, 1967) is an Israeli judoka. She was the first Israeli to win an Olympic medal. She is widely recognized as one of Israel's most successful athletes and is credited with bringing judo into the athletic mainstream.

After her retirement, Arad developed a career as a businesswoman and CEO. She specializes in entrepreneurship, business development and marketing strategy. She manages the commercial rights of ViacomCBS in Israel. Arad advises companies in various sectors and lectures on excellence in sports, life and business.

Biography
Arad, who is Jewish, was born in Tel Aviv, Israel, to Aryeh Arad, a journalist in Davar, Galei Tzahal & Kol Yisrael, and Nurit Arad, a journalist in Yedioth Ahronoth reporting in the field of consumerism. She holds a bachelor's degree in business administration from Reichman University.

International judo career

Arad started taking judo classes at the age of eight and within half a year, ranked second in Israel in her weight class. She later trained with the coach of the men's judo team. She won her first international title in 1984 at the age of 17, competing as a middleweight. She came in 7th in the 1984 World Judo Championships in Vienna. She won bronze medals in the European Championships of 1989 and 1991. To hone her skills, she  underwent training in Japan.

Arad was the first Israeli athlete to win an Olympic medal when she competed at the 1992 Summer Olympics in Barcelona. She won the silver medal in the half middleweight competition. She lost to Catherine Fleury of France. Arad dedicated the medal to the victims of the 1972 Munich Massacre.

In May 1993, she won a gold medal in the 1993 European championships. In the world championships that year, she lost in the finals to Gella Vandecaveye of Belgium, taking home a silver medal.

She was chosen to light the torch at the 1993 Maccabiah Games. She finished in fifth place at the 1995 World Championships.

At the 1996 Olympics in Atlanta, Arad lost to Jung Sung-Sook of Korea, competing for the bronze. She went into the fight sick with a virus and ended up in fifth place.

She served as judo coach for Israel in the 2000 Sydney Olympics, and coached Israeli judoka Olympian Orit Bar-On.

Olympic medal
After winning her Olympic medal, Arad wrote: Thursday, July 30, 1992. A fateful day, a watershed day, a day of fame, a day of self-fulfillment. A day that required fifteen years of hard work, endless investment and hidden self-confidence. The day I won the Olympic silver medal. My medal. The first medal of the State of Israel. … I went onto the mat like a stormy wind, after a warm-up that drove from my body all the little demons that threatened to defeat me even before it all began. The first match was against a woman from Spain who had already defeated me twice in the past, but it was clear to me that this time she had no chance. I went off after four minutes, the winner. The second match was against a woman from the Czech Republic. We knew each other well and we both knew I was better. The victory over her contributed a bit more to building confidence for the tough and significant match of the day. Four minutes were all that stood between myself and my life’s dream. … When the match started, the semi-finals, I was there with all my battle gear. And suddenly, it was all over. I had won. … Emotionally it was the highest moment of my life and despite my losing later in the finals the victory in the semi-finals against the woman from Germany was the sweetest of all. That day I changed from a person who wanted to a person who could. And that made all the difference.

Retirement
After retiring from the sport, Arad continued with judo as a coach and sports entrepreneur. Today she holds a key management position in a children's product company and serves as a TV commentator at judo competitions.

Olympic Movement
Since 2012, Arad is a member of the Marketing Commission and the Digital & Technology Commission at the International Olympic Committee. In 2013, she became a board member of the Olympic Committee of Israel and Chairwomen of its Sports Commission. In 2021, she was appointed to President of the Olympic Committee of Israel making her the first woman and first Olympic medalist to hold the position.

Personal life
Arad was married to Lior Kahane (son of Israeli basketball coach Rani Kahane) and she has two children.

Her book
Arad's autobiography called First (Rishona in Hebrew) was released in 2018.

Awards and honors
Arad has won 24 medals during her sporting career in Level A tournaments, including 7 gold medals, 8 silver medals and 9 bronze medals.

In 2004, Arad was chosen to be one of the torchbearers at the Torch-lighting Ceremony (Israel) on Mount Herzl.

In 2018, Arad was awarded the title to "The Athlete of 70'" from the Ministry of Culture and Sport (Israel), marking the 70th anniversary of the founding of Israel.

See also
List of select Jewish judokas
 Sports in Israel
 Women in Israel

References

External links

Further reading
Women of valor : stories of great Jewish women who helped shape the twentieth century  Women of Valor: Stories of Great Jewish Women Who Helped Shape the 20th Century], Sheila Segal, Behrman House, Inc, 1996, pp. 123–26

1967 births
Living people
Israeli Jews
Olympic silver medalists for Israel
Israeli female judoka
Judoka at the 1992 Summer Olympics
Judoka at the 1996 Summer Olympics
Jewish martial artists
Olympic judoka of Israel
Sportspeople from Tel Aviv
Israeli people of Romanian-Jewish descent
Olympic medalists in judo
International Jewish Sports Hall of Fame inductees
Judoka trainers
Medalists at the 1992 Summer Olympics